Idaea mutanda is a moth of the family Geometridae first described by Warren in 1888. It is found in Sri Lanka.

References

Moths of Asia
Moths described in 1888